Jean-Noël de Bouillane de Lacoste (23 December 1934 – 21 July 2020) was a French ambassador and diplomat.

Biography
He was a descendant of the de Bouillane family, with old nobility from Dauphiné. De Bouillane de Lacoste studied at Lycée Ronsard in Vendôme and the Lycée Michel Montaigne in Bordeaux. He earned a degree in political studies from the École nationale d'administration in 1964.

De Bouillane de Lacoste served numerous ambassadorial roles throughout his career, most notably as Ambassador of France to Laos, to Tunisia, and to Israel.

He also served as President of the Fréquence protestante radio from 2001 to 2007. He also wrote in the journal Réforme. He was an active member of Action des chrétiens pour l'abolition de la torture.

Jean-Noël de Bouillane de Lacoste died on 21 July 2020 in Le Kremlin-Bicêtre at the age of 85.

Distinctions
Commander of the Legion of Honour
Commander of the Ordre national du Mérite
Officer of the Order of Polonia Restituta

References

1934 births
2020 deaths
20th-century French diplomats
Ambassadors of France to Tunisia
Ambassadors of France to Israel
Commandeurs of the Légion d'honneur
Officers of the Order of Polonia Restituta
People from Vendôme